Rahmatabad (also Romanized as Raḩmatābād) is a village in Hakimabad Rural District, in the Central District of Zarandieh County, Markazi Province, Iran. At the 2006 census, its population was 426, in 112 families.

Demography

Original inhabitants of the village were from Turkic descendants, immigrated during Seljukians conquests.

During constitutional revolution, the village became surrounded with battlement and gates to serve as a castle for Iran central plateau en route Tehran, new capital for Qajarid monarchy. Afterwards, tribes from other regions including Yazd, Kashan and Shiraz were forced to reside in the village.

The new migrants adopted the inhabitants language and culture, but nowadays resulting from governmental assimilation program, the language and customs have changed to which of Persians.

References 

Populated places in Zarandieh County